is a Japanese actor and model. He won the Grand Prix at the 27th Junon Super Boy Contest.

Biography
Nishime was born in 1998 in Gushikawa, Okinawa Prefecture. He lived in Nagano Prefecture from 3 to 5 years old and returned to Gushikawa. After graduating from junior high school, he moved to Tokyo in order to become an actor. While aiming to be an actor, he lived in his aunt's house and attended a Tokyo high school. In 2014, he won the Grand Prix at the 27th Junon Super Boy Contest while during his second grade high school.

In 2015, he was appointed as the lead role in Kamen Rider Ghost. As starring alone, he is the youngest lead role tying with Takeru Satoh (Kamen Rider Den-O)

Filmography

Films

TV series

References

External links
Official profile 

Japanese male models
21st-century Japanese male actors
1998 births
Living people
People from Okinawa Prefecture